Jorge Daniel Achucarro (born 6 November 1981) is a retired Paraguayan footballer. He has played for the Paraguay national football team.

Career

Club career
Achucarro began his professional playing career in 1998 with Cerro Porteño, where he made over 200 appearances before leaving the club in 2008 to join the Mexican side Atlas.

In 2009, he was signed by Newell's Old Boys as a replacement for the club's former striker, the Paraguayan Santiago Salcedo.

Later and coaching career
In March 2019, Achucarro returned to the pitch, joining Paraguayan lower side Club 4 de Agosto in Areguá. However, he moved to another club in the summer 2019, joining Club 8 de Setiembre in Valle Pucú, Areguá.

Beside playing for 8 de Setiembre, which he was crowned champion of the 2019 Liga Regional de Areguá with, Achucarro was also hired as U16 head coach at his former club Cerro Porteño. On 9 October 2019, he was promoted as assistant coach to interim head coach, Víctor Bernay, for the rest of the season. Achucarro stayed at the club for the 2020 season in a different role.

References

External links
 
 
 
 
 
 Jorge Daniel Achucarro - Primera División statistics at Fútbol XXI  

1981 births
Living people
People from Fernando de la Mora, Paraguay
Paraguayan footballers
Paraguayan expatriate footballers
Paraguay international footballers
Association football forwards
Cerro Porteño players
Club Nacional footballers
Atlas F.C. footballers
Newell's Old Boys footballers
Club Atlético Banfield footballers
Cobreloa footballers
Boca Unidos footballers
Club Atlético Colón footballers
Chacarita Juniors footballers
12 de Octubre Football Club players
General Díaz footballers
Club Rubio Ñu footballers
Deportivo Capiatá players
Paraguayan Primera División players
Chilean Primera División players
Argentine Primera División players
Primera Nacional players
Liga MX players
Expatriate footballers in Chile
Expatriate footballers in Argentina
Expatriate footballers in Mexico
Paraguayan expatriate sportspeople in Chile
Paraguayan expatriate sportspeople in Argentina
Paraguayan expatriate sportspeople in Mexico